Awake? is the tenth studio album by metalcore band Zao. It was released on May 5, 2009, on Ferret Records. It contains nine new tracks and a re-recording of the track "Romance of the Southern Spirit", which originally appeared on the Japanese version of The Funeral of God. Only 8,000 physical copies of the album were made. Each copy is numbered and has six interchangeable covers. The album sold approximately 2,000 copies in its first week. The single "Entropica" debuted in April 2009 prior to the album's release.

Writing and Recording
The album was recorded in California and Pennsylvania, with the vocals, bass, and guitars being recorded in the latter and the drums in the former. While the majority of the recording was done by Dave Hidek in Pennsylvania, Jeff Gretz flew out to California to record drums with Tim Lambesis and Daniel Castleman, with the latter having more involvement in the process. Gretz finished the album with three days left scheduled for recording, which led to his collaboration with Austrian Death Machine on their Double Brutal album.

The album was recorded using Pro Tools rather than Analog recording like they had done with The Fear Is What Keeps Us Here.

Track listing

Credits
Zao
Dan Weyandt - vocals
Scott Mellinger - guitar, clean vocals, engineer
Martin Lunn - bass, vocals
Jeff Gretz - drums

Production
Tim Lambesis - production
Daniel Castleman - engineer, mixing, producer
Dave Hidek - engineer
Alan Douches - mastering
Russ Cogdell - lyrical writing on "Romance of the Southern Spirit"

Cover Art
Gabe Felice - Cover art, lyrical writing on "Reveal"
Invisible Creature
Ryan Clark - layout
Don Clark - layout

References

External links

Zao (American band) albums
2009 albums
Ferret Music albums